Tried and True is the fifth studio album by Clay Aiken, released on June 1, 2010. This album is Aiken's first on the Decca label. The deluxe edition includes two additional tracks plus a second disk with behind the scenes video and a live performance.

Background
The songs on this album are classics from the 1950s and 1960s. "Unchained Melody" and "Mack the Knife" were performed by Aiken when he was a contestant on American Idol's second season. In an article written after interviewing Aiken, The News & Observer reported that "... the album features a guest turn by saxophonist and label-mate David Sanborn on the Sammy Davis Jr. classic 'What Kind of Fool Am I?'  Vince Gill performs guitar on Andy Williams' legendary 'Moon River.'"

Reception

Commercial performance
The album, selling 22,000 units in its first week, made its debut on the Billboard charts at number nine on the Billboard 200 and number twenty-one on Billboard's Digital Albums. In Canada, the album debuted at number 58 on the Canadian Albums Chart, the lowest debut in Canada for any of his albums.

Critical reception
The album received positive reviews. Stephen Thomas Erlewine of Allmusic gave the album 3 out of 5 stars, saying "It’s handsomely tailored music that fits Aiken’s strengths quite well. Indeed, he’s never seemed more at home on a record; nothing may challenge him but he’s never straining, seeming happier singing standards than he did churning out contemporary classics on A Thousand Different Ways, winding up with something that might be the best representation yet of his peculiar charms."

Track listing
Looking like a worn sleeve from a 1950s or 1960s LP, the Tried and True  album art lists the songs included on the front cover.

Standard edition
 "Can't Take My Eyes off You" Written by: Bob Crewe, Bob Gaudio 3:18
 "What Kind of Fool Am I? (featuring David Sanborn)  Written by: Leslie Bricusse, Anthony Newley 3:31
 "It's Only Make Believe" Written by: Jack Nance, Conway Twitty 3:13
 "Misty" Written by: Johnny Burke, Erroll Garner 4:18
 "Mack the Knife" Written by: Kurt Weill, Bertolt Brecht, Marc Blitzstein 3:21
 "It's Impossible" Written by: Armando Manzanero, Sid Wayne 4:02
 "Unchained Melody" Written by: Alex North, Hy Zaret 4:51
 "Suspicious Minds" Written by: Mark James 3:49
 "Crying" (duet with Linda Eder) Written by: Joe Melson, Roy Orbison 4:05
 "There's a Kind of Hush" Written by: Les Reed, Geoff Stephens 3:00
 "Moon River" (featuring Vince Gill) Written by: Henry Mancini, Johnny Mercer 4:11

Deluxe edition
<li> "Who's Sorry Now?"  Written by: Bert Kalmar, Harry Ruby, Ted Snyder 3:47
<li> "Breaking Up Is Hard To Do"  Written by: Neil Sedaka, Howard Greenfield 2:58

Bonus tracks
  "You Don't Have to Say You Love Me" (iTunes exclusive) Written by: Pino Donaggio, Vito Pallavicini, Vicki Wickham, Simon Napier-Bell 4:12

Disc 2 (deluxe edition)
 Behind The Scenes Look: The Making Of Tried And True 6:22
 Build Me Up Buttercup (Live) Written by: Mike d'Abo, Tony Macaulay 2:59

Additional personnel
 Linda Eder (appears courtesy of The Verve Music Group)
 Vince Gill (appears courtesy of MCA Nashville)
 Dave Sanborn (appears courtesy of Decca Label Group)
 Pete Beachill - Trombone (Tenor)
 Gordon Campbell - Trombone (Tenor)
 Andy Wood -Trombone (Tenor)
 Dave Stewart - Trombone (Bass)
 Andy Mackintosh - Flute, Saxophone (Alto)
 Stan Sulzmann - Flute, Saxophone (Alto)
 Dave Bishop - Clarinet, Saxophone (Tenor)
 Ben Castle - Clarinet, Saxophone (Tenor)
 Jeff Daly - Saxophone (Baritone)
 Mitch Dalton - Guitar
 Mark James - Guitar
 Steve Pearce - Bass (Electric)
 Mark Hodgson - Double Bass
 Martin Gordy - Percussion
 Simon Gardner - Trumpet, Flugelhorn
 Noel Langley - Trumpet, Flugelhorn
 Mike Lovatt - Trumpet, Flugelhorn
 Derek Watkins - Trumpet, Flugelhorn
 Pete Murray - Piano
 Ralph Salmins - Drums
 Quiana Parler - Background vocals, vocal production (Tracks 7 and 11)
 G-Strings Orchestra (Track 9)
 Thomas Bowes - Violin
 Jonathan Rees - Violin
 Vicci Wardman - Violin
 Anthony Pleeth - Cello
 Chris Walden - Arranger, Conductor, Trumpet, Flugelhorn, Soloist
 Jesse Vargas - Arranger (Tracks 3 and 9)
 Ben Cohn - Arranger (Track 7)
 Carl Marsh - Arranger (Track 11 and 12)
 Alex Christensen - Producer
 Isobel Griffiths - Orchestra Contractor
 Vlado Meller - Mastering
 Jochem van der Saag - Mixing
 Vincent Soyez - Photography
 Dave Novik - Executive Producer, A&R
 Paul Altomari - A&R coordination
 Amy Merxbauer - A&R administration
 Evelyn Morgan - A&R administration
 Tom Arndt - Package Coordinator
 Denise Trotman - Package Design
 Fanny Gotschall - Art Direction

Recording and mixing
 Angel Recording Studios, London, UK
 Home Studios, Hamburg, Germany
 Universal Mastering Studios, New York City, NY
 Additional vocals
 Soundpure Studios, Durham, NC (Track 7)
 Strange Cranium Studios, New York City, NY (Track 9)
 Osceola Studios, Raleigh, NC (Track 11)

References

2010 albums
Clay Aiken albums
Covers albums
Decca Records albums